Ithum Oru Jeevitham is a 1982 Indian Malayalam-language film, directed by Veliyam Chandran and produced by Udaya. The film stars Jagathy Sreekumar, Thikkurissy Sukumaran Nair, Kalpana and Sukumaran. The film has musical score by R. Somasekharan.

Cast
Jagathy Sreekumar as Sankaran
Thikkurissy Sukumaran Nair as Padmanaban Thampi 
Kalpana as Sheela
Sukumaran as Sreekumar
Kanakadurga as Rathi 
Kottarakkara Sreedharan Nair as Old man
Sharmila as Seetha
Sai Kumar as Kuttan
Aranmula Ponnamma as Madhavi
Aryad Gopalakrishnan as Raghavan Nair
Poojappura Ravi as Seetha's father
Chavara V. P. Nair as Dasammavan
Aroor Sathyan as Menon
PN Gopalakrishna Pilla as Krishnan
Kedamangalam Ali as Rathi's uncle

Soundtrack
The music was composed by R. Somasekharan and the lyrics were written by Vellanad Narayanan and Konniyoor Bhas.

References

External links
 

1982 films
1980s Malayalam-language films